Per Emil Hugo Andersson (born 1 January 1999) is a Swedish professional footballer who plays as a centre-back for Danish Superliga club Randers FC.

Career

Malmö FF
Andersson began playing football for hometown club Skurup's AIF. As a 12-year-old, he joined Malmö FF's youth academy. On 20 May 2018, Andersson made his Allsvenskan debut in a 2–0 win over BK Häcken, where he came on as a substitute in the 87th minute for Mattias Svanberg.

In February 2019, Andersson was sent on loan to Trelleborgs FF for the 2019 season. On 25 August 2020, it was confirmed, that Andersson had joined Danish Superliga club Hobro IK on a loan deal for the 2020–21 season. In August 2021, he was loaned out to the Superettan club IFK Värnamo on a six-month deal.

Randers
On 29 January 2022, Andersson signed a three-and-a-half-year contract with Danish Superliga club Randers.

Career statistics

References

External links 
 
 
 Malmö FF profile  
 

1999 births
Living people
Swedish footballers
Swedish expatriate footballers
Sweden youth international footballers
Sweden under-21 international footballers
Association football defenders
Footballers from Skåne County
Malmö FF players
Trelleborgs FF players
Hobro IK players
IFK Värnamo players
Allsvenskan players
Superettan players
Danish 1st Division players
Danish Superliga players
Swedish expatriate sportspeople in Denmark
Expatriate men's footballers in Denmark
Randers FC players
People from Skurup Municipality